Fore River (also known as the Fore River Shipbuilding Company Stars) was an amateur U.S. soccer team which had its origins as the Fore River Shipbuilding company team of Quincy, Massachusetts.

History
Early team records are spotty, but the team existed at least as early as 1907  Apparently, the team played in a series of local amateur leagues, including the New England League (NEL) which featured several of the better U.S. teams of that era.  The only year for which NEL standings exist are 1908-1909 when Fore River finished fourth.  In 1915, the team won the Massachusetts State Cup with a victory over Lynne Fosse F.C.  They won a second cup title in 1919 and its third in 1921.

In 1915, Fore River entered the Southern New England Soccer League (SNESL).  This amateur league attempted to create a viable league which spanned an area larger than that covered by most city leagues.  In its first season in the league, Fore River topped the standings when the remainder of the season was canceled due to numerous weather cancelations.  In 1918, the league suspended operations as a result of the loss of players to military service in World War I.  Fore River then moved to the Boston League for the 1918-1919 season.  Fore River returned to the SNESL in 1919, but there are no records for this season.  The team reached its greatest success in the 1920-1921 season.  It won the league title, reached the final of the American Cup and went to the fifth round of the National Challenge Cup.  However, the creation of the American Soccer League (ASL) led to the collapse of both the SNESL and the National Association Football League when several top teams from both leagues defected to the ASL.

Year-by-year

Honors
American Cup
 Runner Up (1): 1921

National Challenge Cup
 Runner Up (1): 1920

Massachusetts State Cup
 Winner (3): 1914, 1919, 1921

League Championship
 Winner (3): 1916, 1919, 1921

External links
 Southern New England Soccer League standings

References

Defunct soccer clubs in Massachusetts
Southern New England Soccer League teams
Fore River Shipyard